Donald Rooum (20 April 1928 – 31 August 2019) was an English anarchist cartoonist and writer. He had a long association with Freedom Press who have published seven volumes of his Wildcat cartoons.

In 1963 he played a key role in exposing Harold Challenor, a corrupt police officer who tried to frame him.

Biography
Donald Rooum was born in Bradford. He registered as a conscientious objector but was pressured by his family into doing two years military service, starting January 1947. A resettlement grant following his discharge allowed him to study commercial design at Bradford Regional Art School from 1949 to 1953. Rooum's 1952 portrait by Frank Lisle, one of his lecturers of the time, is in Wakefield Gallery.

From 1954 to 1966 Rooum worked as a layout artist and typographer in London advertising agencies, then as a lecturer in typographic design at the London College of Printing until 1983. He studied life sciences at the Open University from 1973 to 1979, and was awarded a first class degree in 1980. He was elected Member of the Institute of Biology (incorporated into the Society of Biology in October 2009) and became a chartered biologist in 2004.

Rooum lived with Irene Brown from 1954 to 1983 and they had four children: Josephine Anne (born 1956), Penelope Jane (born 1958 died 1960), Mathew Donald (born 1960) and Rebecca Jane (born 1962).

Activism
Rooum said that he first became interested in anarchism in 1944 when he visited Speaker's Corner in London while on a Ministry of Food scheme which used schoolboys to pick hops in Kent. He subscribed to War Commentary, thus beginning a connection with Freedom Press which continued for over sixty years. During that time he was a writer for and an editor of Freedom, the name to which War Commentary reverted after the end of the Second World War.

In 1949, Rooum began to raise his profile in activist circles, participating in the annual anarchist summer school. The working title of Frank Lisle's 1952 portrait was The Anarchist. Rooum became an outdoor speaker Market Street, Bradford, then at Speaker's Corner. He was a founding member of the Malatesta Club, an anarchist social club and venue that opened in London on May Day 1954. Rooum and Irene Brown worked as volunteers there.

In the long-running feud between Vernon Richards and Freedom on the one hand, and Albert Meltzer and Black Flag on the other, Rooum sided with Richards.

Thought 
As to his theoretical position as an anarchist, Rooum stated: "The most influential source is Max Stirner. I am happy to be called a Stirnerite anarchist, provided 'Stirnerite' means one who agrees with Stirner's general drift, not one who agrees with Stirner's every word." An Anarchist FAQ reports that "From meeting anarchists in Glasgow during the Second World War, long-time anarchist activist and artist Donald Rooum likewise combined Stirner and anarcho-communism.".

Role in the Challenor affair

In 1963 Rooum exposed police corruption during demonstrations against the London visit by King Paul of Greece and Queen Frederika. There had been attempts to outlaw the demonstrations and draconian prison sentences were passed on demonstrators. The government was criticized in the press for the severity of the sentences and eventually there were embarrassing climb-downs. Some of the sentences were overturned on appeal and the Home Secretary, Henry Brooke, had to offer financial compensation.

Rooum proved that an offensive weapon had been planted on him. On 11 July, he had joined a demonstration against the royal party at Claridge's hotel. He held up a banner reading, "Lambrakis RIP", referring to a Greek MP and peace activist who had been murdered.  According to Rooum's account, the banner was confiscated by a police officer and read by four plain clothes men.  Rooum asked, "Can I have my banner back?"  He was approached by one of the officers: "This big one with the short-back-and-sides stepped forward. 'Can you have your what back?' "'My banner."  "He smiled at me.  'You're fucking nicked, my old beauty,' he said, and gave me a terrific clout on the ear." At the police station, the officer, Detective Sergeant Harold Challenor, "took from his pocket a screwed-up newspaper, which he opened with a flourish.  Inside was a piece of brick.  His smile widened. 'There you are, my old beauty.  Carrying an offensive weapon.  You can get two years for that.'" Rooum was a member of the National Council of Civil Liberties and he had, by good fortune, read some material on forensic science and so gave his clothes to his defence solicitor Stanley Clinton Davis for analysis. No brick dust was found in his pocket and Rooum convinced the magistrate that therefore no brick could have been there at the time of the alleged offence. There followed a public inquiry that criticised the police and led to the imprisonment of three officers. Rooum received £500 compensation (£9,655 at 2017 value) and other convictions were overturned. Challenor was deemed mentally unfit to plead and was committed to Netherne mental hospital. A subsequent enquiry found that he had probably begun developing paranoid schizophrenia for some months before the incident, but the lack of any successful prosecution against him was seen by some as evidence of further establishment corruption.

Cartoonist
In 1952, Philip Sansom invited Rooum to draw a regular cartoon strip for The Syndicalist and he contributed Scissor Bill. The name derived from an IWW name for a bosses' yes-man. From 1960, his cartoons started appearing in such outlets as  She, The Daily Mirror, Private Eye and The Spectator. Rooum has had a long relationship, with interruptions, with Peace News, his first work appearing for them in 1962. Originals of his cartoons for Peace News up to 1971, together with some for The Spectator, are stored at the British Cartoon Archive.

In 1974, Sansom invited Rooum to provide a cartoon for a monthly magazine he was working on, Wildcat.  Rooum created a character of the same name. Wildcat ceased publication in 1975 but in 1980, when Sansom was again working on Freedom, he persuaded Rooum and the editorial collective to revive the Wildcat comic strip, which featured in every edition until Freedom ceased printing in 2014. In 2016, PM Press of California published Wildcat Anarchist Comics, a collection of Donald Rooum's cartoons coloured by Jayne Clementson, with some autobiographical material, and What is Anarchism 2nd edition, an expanded version of the Freedom Press What is Anarchism 1992.

Rooum has drawn the Sprite strip for The Skeptic magazine since 1987. He has illustrated several books, including Don't you believe it! by John Radford. An exhibition of Rooum's work was held at Conway Hall in 2008.

Wildcat, a short film by Adam Louis-Jacob (2018) has an animated, coloured Wildcat walking past some of Rooum's black and white strip cartoons for Freedom, drawing attention to the speech balloons.

Bibliography

As author and cartoonist
Wildcat Anarchist Comics, 1985, London, Freedom Press, 
"Gandalf's Garden" in: Outrageous Tales from the Old Testament ed: Tony Bennett, 1987, London, Knockabout Comics, 
Wildcat Strikes Again, 1989, London, Freedom Press, 
Wildcat: ABC of Bosses,1991, London, Freedom Press, 
Health Service Wildcat,  1994, London, Freedom Press, 
Twenty Year Millennium Wildcat: Anarchist Comics 1999, London, Freedom Press, 
Wildcat: Anarchists Against Bombs, 2003, London, Freedom Press, 
Wildcat Keeps Going, 2011, London, Freedom Press, 
Wildcat Anarchist Comics, 2016, Oakland CA, PM Press, 
What is Anarchism? 2nd edition, 2016, Oakland CA, PM Press,

As writer
"Sir Cyril Burt and typography: a re-evaluation" James Hartley and Donald Rooum 1983 British Journal of Psychology 74, 203–212
"Karl von Frisch and the 'Spot Codes' for marking insects". 1989, Bee World 70:120–126
What Is Anarchism?: An Introduction, edited by Vernon Richards, London, Freedom Press, 
Introduction to Mutual Aid: A Factor of Evolution (4th Edition) by Peter Kropotkin London, Freedom Press, 2009

As illustrator
Classics of Humour (Dickens, Charles; O'Brien, Flann; Saki; Thurber, James; Twain, Mark; Waugh, Evelyn; Wilde, Oscar, Wodehouse, P G, et al., authors); O'Mara, Michael (ed), Donald Rooum (Illustrator) 1976 Book Club Associates ASIN B0010S72HK, 1976 Constable and Company 
English Lessons One Michael Hapgood (author), Donald Rooum (illustrator); 1981 Heinemann Educational Books 
The innocent Anthropologist by Nigel Barley (author), Donald Rooum (illustrator); 1983 British Museum Publications !SBN 0714180548
Don't You Believe It!: Some Things Everyone Knows That Actually Ain't So by John Radford (Author), Donald Rooum (Illustrator), London 2007, Stepney Green Press, 
Citizenship Cartoons (2003) by Alastair Gunn (Author), Donald Rooum (Author) Classroom Resources

As editor
"Freedom": A Hundred Years, October 1886 – October 1986 London, Freedom Press, 1986 
March to Death: Drawings By John Olday, London, Freedom Press, 1995 
What is Anarchism? 2nd edition 2016, Oakland CA, PM Press,

Notes

References
 The Challenor Case by Mary Grigg; Harmondsworth 1965 Penguin Books
 The Jester and the Court by Edward Robey; London 1976 William Kimber &  Co. Ltd 
 Tanky Challenor, SAS and the Met by Harold Challoner with Edward Draper, London 1990, Leo Cooper

External links
Cartoons placed online by the British Cartoon Archive
 Donald Rooum, pt1: Author, Cartoonist + Anarchist – episode of podcast The Final Straw

1928 births
2019 deaths
Alumni of the Open University
Artists from Bradford
British comic strip cartoonists
Egoist anarchists
English anarchists
English cartoonists
Individualist anarchists
People associated with Conway Hall Ethical Society